Kim Ji-yeon (born August 19, 1995), better known by her stage name Bona, is a South Korean singer and actress. She is a member of the South Korean-Chinese girl group WJSN, and also its sub-unit WJSN The Black. She made her acting debut in the KBS2 drama Hit the Top (2017), and was cast as the female lead in the teen drama Girls' Generation 1979 (2018). Most recently, Bona gained recognition for her portrayal as world champion and gold medalist fencer Ko Yu-rim in the tvN drama Twenty-Five Twenty-One (2022).

Early life and education
Bona was born on August 19, 1995, in Dalseo District, Daegu, South Korea. She graduated from Dongguk Girls' High School.

Career

Pre-debut
Before joining Starship Entertainment, Bona was a trainee under Cube Entertainment and trained with them before joining Starship Entertainment in 2013.

2016–present: Debut with WJSN and solo activities

She was revealed to be a member of WJSN and its Wonder Unit on December 15, 2015, and proceeded to debut with them on February 25, 2016, with their debut mini-album Would You Like? and the single "MoMoMo".

In 2017, she made her acting debut in the KBS2 drama Hit the Top, and was cast as the female lead in the teen drama Girls' Generation 1979. She made a cameo in Radio Romance in 2018, before her second lead role in Your House Helper. Bona was revealed to have joined the cast of Law of the Jungle in Northern Mariana Islands.

In 2020, Bona joined the KBS2 drama Homemade Love Story, playing as Lee Hae-deun. She earned the Best New Actress at the 2020 KBS Drama Awards for her acting in the series.

In 2022, Bona rose to prominence for her role as a world champion and gold medalist fencer alongside Kim Tae-ri and Nam Joo-hyuk in the tvN drama Twenty-Five Twenty-One. The drama became one of the highest-rated Korean dramas in cable television history.

After scheduling conflicts with the filming of Twenty-Five Twenty-One, Bona joined WJSN in the third round of Mnet competition show Queendom, which the group ultimately won in June 2022.

Discography

Soundtrack appearances

Filmography

Television series

Television shows

Awards and nominations

References

External links

 

1995 births
Living people
People from Daegu
South Korean women pop singers
South Korean television actresses
21st-century South Korean actresses
21st-century South Korean singers
Mandarin-language singers of South Korea
Starship Entertainment artists
Cosmic Girls members
South Korean female idols
21st-century South Korean women singers